Charlie Chan in the Secret Service is a 1944 mystery film starring Sidney Toler as Charlie Chan.  It is the first film made by Monogram Pictures after the series was dropped by 20th Century Fox, and it marks the introduction of Number Three Son (Benson Fong) and taxi driver (later Chan's chauffeur), Birmingham Brown (Mantan Moreland).

Plot
In the two years since the last Charlie Chan feature film (Castle in the Desert), Charlie Chan is now an agent of the U.S. government working in Washington DC and he is assigned to investigate the murder of the inventor of a highly advanced torpedo. Aiding Chan is his overeager but dull-witted Number Three son Tommy (Benson Fong) and his Number Two Daughter Iris Chan (Marianne Quon). Also involved in the case is the bumbling and easily frightened Birmingham Brown (Mantan Moreland) who works as a limo driver for one of the suspects.

Cast
Sidney Toler as Charlie Chan
Mantan Moreland as Birmingham Brown, Taxi Driver
Arthur Loft as Inspector Jones, Secret Service
Gwen Kenyon as Inez Arranto
Sarah Edwards as Mrs. Hargue, Housekeeper
George J. Lewis as Paul Arranto (as George Lewis)
Marianne Quon as Iris Chan
Benson Fong as Tommy Chan
Muni Seroff as Peter Laska
Barry Bernard as David Blake
Gene Roth as Luis Philipe Vega aka Von Vegon (as Gene Stutenroth)
Eddy Chandler as Lewis, Secret Service (as Eddie Chandler)
Lelah Tyler as Mrs. Williams

Production
20th Century Fox stopped making Charlie Chan films in 1941. In May 1943 Monogram Pictures announced they had purchased the rights to the character from Fox and would make two Charlie Chan films a year. Sidney Toler would reprise his performance as Chan. Keye Luke was reportedly unable to reprise his role as Number One Son, so a search started for an actor to portray Chan's son.

In June 1943 Monogram Pictures announced Charlie Chan and the Secret Service would be one of 24 movies and 16 Westerns the studio would make over the following year. This was eight less than the previous year as Monogram said they wanted to make "fewer and higher budgeted pictures".

The film was to star Sidney Toler and also include Iris Wong from the Fox movies. In July 1943 Benson Fong was signed to play Chan's son. Wong eventually was replaced by Marianne Quon.

Filming started 10 September 1943.

See also
List of American films of 1944

References

External links
Charlie Chan Family

1944 films
1940s crime films
American black-and-white films
Charlie Chan films
Monogram Pictures films
American crime films
Films directed by Phil Rosen
1940s American films